Çevre is an unpopulated village in the Şemdinli District in Hakkâri Province in Turkey. The village had a population of 0 in 2022 but was previously populated by Kurds of the Humaru tribe.

History 
The village had a population of 355 in 1967 and 724 in 1990. According to Vital Cuinet, the villagers were from the Hakkari tribe who were related to the people in the other Bay village in the area.

Population 
Population history of the village from 1967 to 2022:

See also 

 Ayranlı

References 

Villages in Şemdinli District
Kurdish settlements in Hakkâri Province
Unpopulated villages in Turkey